Grupo Latino de Radio (GLR) is the U.S. subsidiary of PRISA Radio, holding company for Grupo PRISA’s radio assets. GLR operates two radio stations in the U.S. (Caracol WSUA 1260AM in Miami and W Radio XEWW 690AM in Southern California). GLR Networks is the content production and distribution arm that supplies Spanish language radio stations in the U.S. with news services and stories focused on sports, entertainment and community programming, as well as a variety of musical formats.

External links
GLR Webpage

PRISA
American radio networks
Spanish-language radio in the United States